The Union is a collaboration studio album by singer-songwriters Elton John and Leon Russell, released on 19 October 2010 in the US and on 25 October in the UK. This is John's second collaboration album, after 1993's Duets. This is the first studio release by John since 1979's Victim of Love without any of his regular band members. It is also his highest charting studio album on the Billboard 200 since 1976's Blue Moves, debuting at No. 3, as well as Russell's highest charting studio album since 1972's Carney. The Union was No. 3 on Rolling Stone magazine's list of the 30 Best Albums of 2010.

The album features appearances by Booker T. Jones (on Hammond B-3), Neil Young (vocals), Robert Randolph (pedal steel), and Brian Wilson (vocal harmonies). This album was dedicated to Guy Babylon, John's keyboard player who died a year before its release. "If It Wasn't for Bad" was nominated for the 53rd Annual Grammy Awards for Best Pop Collaboration with Vocals and
"Hey Ahab" became a staple in John's concert tours.

Track listing

Personnel
Elton John: vocals (1-15), piano (2-4, 6-15)
Leon Russell: piano, vocals; BGV arrangement (1, 5, 7, 10, 16)
Jim Keltner: drums & percussion (1-9, 11-15)
Jay Bellerose: drums & percussion (1-15)
Mike Piersante: tambourine (3, 8), percussion (11)
Debra Dobkin: beaded gourd (6)
Mike Ford: percussion (11)
Dennis Crouch: acoustic bass (1-4, 6–10, 12-15)
Don Was: bass guitar (5, 11)
Davey Faragher: bass guitar (5)
Drew Lambert: electric bass (16)
Marc Ribot: guitar (1-4, 6, 7, 9, 10, 13-15), acoustic guitar (8)
T Bone Burnett: electric guitar (3, 6, 12)
Doyle Bramhall II: guitar (5, 11)
Robert Randolph: pedal steel (7)
Russ Pahl: pedal steel (6)
Booker T. Jones: Hammond B-3 organ (1, 5, 9, 11)
Keefus Ciancia: keyboards (1-15)
Marty Grebb: keyboards (7, 16)
Jason Wormer: dulcimer (4), percussion (11)
Darrell Leonard: trumpet (1, 4, 5, 8, 11, 13), bass trumpet (1, 11, 13), horn arrangements & conductor (1, 4, 5, 8, 11, 13)
Ira Nepus: trombone (1, 4, 11)
Maurice Spears: trombone (1, 4, 11)
George Bohanon: trombone (1, 4, 11), baritone (1, 4, 11)
William Roper: tuba (1, 4, 11)
Thomas Peterson: saxophone (5, 8, 11, 13)
Joseph Sublett: saxophone (5, 8, 11, 13)
Jim Thompson: saxophone (5, 8, 11, 13)
Bill Maxwell: BGV conductor (1-3, 5–10, 12-16), BGV arrangement (2, 3, 6, 8, 9, 12-15)
Brian Wilson: backing vocals & BGV arrangement on "When Love Is Dying"
Neil Young: vocals on "Gone to Shiloh"
Rose Stone: backing vocals (1, 3, 8, 10, 12, 16), tambourine (10)
Tanya Balam: backing vocals (3, 8, 16)
Bill Cantos: backing vocals (2, 3, 6, 8, 9, 12-16)
Judith Hill: backing vocals (1, 3, 5, 7, 8, 10, 13, 14, 16)
Kellyie Huff: backing vocals (3, 8, 16)
Perry Morgan: backing vocals (3, 8, 16)
Lou Pardini: backing vocals (2, 6, 9, 12, 15)
Jason Scheff: backing vocals (2, 6, 9, 12, 15)
Tiffany Smith: backing vocals (3, 8, 16
Alfie Silas-Durio: backing vocals (1, 3, 5, 7, 8, 10, 12-16)
Tata Vega: backing vocals (1-3, 5–10, 12-16)
Jean Witherspoon: backing vocals (1, 3, 5, 7, 8, 10, 12, 16)

Production
Produced by T-Bone Burnett
Executive Producers: Elton John and Johnny Barbis.
Production Coordination: Adrian Collee, Jon Howard and Ivy Skoff.
Recorded by Mike Piersante and Jason Wormer.
Assistant Engineers: Ben McAmis, Kyle Ford, Mark Lambert, Brett Lind, Chris Owens, Kory Aaron and Vanessa Parr.
Recorded at Quad Studios (Nashville) and The Village Recorder (Los Angeles).
Mixed by Mike Piersante at The Village Recorder.
Edited by Jason Wormer
Mastered by Gavin Lurssen at Lurssen Mastering (Los Angeles, CA).
Guitar Technician: Paul Ackling
Transcription by John Eidsvoog and Julie Eidsvoog.
Design: Peacock
Photography: Frank W. Ockenfels 3, Joseph Guay, Annie Leibovitz and Steve Todoroff.
Management (Elton John): Rocket Music Management.
Management (Leon Russell): Johnny Barbis.
Management (T-Bone Burnett): Larry Jenkins, assisted by Jessica C. Mitchell.

Reception

The Union received mostly positive reviews with critics praising it as some of the pair's best work to date. It reached No. 3 on Rolling Stone magazine's list of the 30 Best Albums of 2010.

Charts

Grammy Awards

|-
|2011 || "If It Wasn't for Bad" || Best Pop Collaboration with Vocals || 
|-

Certifications

References

External links
 youtube.com, Elton John & Leon Russell on CBS Sunday Morning (12-12-10)
 
 
 YouTube,, Leon Russell's Induction into The Rock & Roll Hall Of Fame 2011
 Leon Russell NAMM Oral History Program Interview (2012)

2010 albums
Collaborative albums
Elton John albums
Leon Russell albums
Albums produced by T Bone Burnett
Decca Records albums
Mercury Records albums